Arcane (titled onscreen as Arcane: League of Legends) is an animated action-adventure streaming television series created by Christian Linke and Alex Yee for Netflix. It was produced by the French animation studio Fortiche under the supervision of Riot Games. Set in Riot's League of Legends fictional universe, it primarily focuses on sisters Vi and Jinx. The series was announced at the League of Legends 10th anniversary celebration in 2019, and first released in November 2021. Following the conclusion of the first season, Riot Games and Netflix announced that a second season was in production.

Arcanes first season was released to critical acclaim, with praise directed at its animation, story, worldbuilding, action sequences, characters, emotional weight, music, and voice acting. Some have noted the series' appeal both to casual viewers who have never played League of Legends and to long-time fans of the game. It also set the record as Netflix's highest-rated series at the time within a week of its premiere, ranked first on the Netflix Top 10 Chart in 52 countries, and ranked second on the chart in the United States. Several critics and publications considered it one of the best video game adaptations ever made. In 2022, the series became the first streaming series to win a Primetime Emmy Award for Outstanding Animated Program and won an Annie Award for Best General Audience Animated Television Broadcast Production.

Premise
Amidst the escalating unrest between the rich, utopian city of Piltover and its seedy, oppressed underbelly of Zaun, sisters Vi and Jinx find themselves on opposing sides of a brewing conflict over clashing convictions and arcane technologies.

Cast and characters

Main
 Hailee Steinfeld as Violet "Vi"
 Ella Purnell as Powder / Jinx
 Mia Sinclair Jenness as young Powder
 Kevin Alejandro as Jayce Talis
 Katie Leung as Caitlyn Kiramman
 Molly Harris as young Caitlyn Kiramman
 Jason Spisak as Silco
 Toks Olagundoye as Mel Medarda
 Harry Lloyd as Viktor
 JB Blanc as Vander
 Reed Shannon as Ekko
 Miles Brown as young Ekko
 Mick Wingert as Cecil B. Heimerdinger

Supporting
 Amirah Vann as Sevika
 Remy Hii as Marcus and Tobias Kiramman
 Abigail Marlowe as Cassandra Kiramman and Eve
 Yuri Lowenthal as Mylo
 Roger Craig Smith as Claggor
 Josh Keaton as Deckard and Salo
 Fred Tatasciore as Benzo
 Bill Lobley as Huck
 Shohreh Aghdashloo as Grayson
 Brett Tucker as Singed
 Mara Junot as Shoola and Jules
 Dave B. Mitchell as Vern, Hoskel, and Harold
 Miyavi as Finn
 Erica Lindbeck as Elora
 Ellen Thomas as Ambessa Medarda
 Mira Furlan as Babette
 Kimberly Brooks as Sky Young
 Imagine Dragons as The Last Drop band
 JID as The Last Drop band rapper
 Ray Chen as orchestra concert soloist

Episodes

Production

Riot Games CEO Nicolo Laurent said it took six years to make the first season of Arcane.

Arcane's production differed from standard industry practice. The idea for Arcane first came from Christian Linke in 2015 after Riot had initially delved into other media to help strengthen the connections players had with the IP such as cinematic trailers and music videos. But at that point, none of the promotional content had any dialogue. Next, instead of finding a new animation studio that specialized in television animation, Riot decided to continue their partnership with Fortiche who had produced music videos for them. Riot also targeted the "adult-minded" animation market instead of more established markets for video game to television animation adaptations.

Arcane was first announced at the League of Legends 10th anniversary celebration in 2019, and is set in Riot's League of Legends fictional universe, In September 2021, it was announced that Hailee Steinfeld, Ella Purnell, Kevin Alejandro, Katie Leung, Jason Spisak, Toks Olagundoye, JB Blanc and Harry Lloyd had joined the voice cast.

On November 20, 2021, following the conclusion of Arcanes first season, Riot Games and Netflix announced that a second season was in production for a post-2022 release.

Broadcast

Marketing
Riot Games promoted the launch of Arcane through events in their games, including League of Legends, Legends of Runeterra, Teamfight Tactics, League of Legends: Wild Rift, and Valorant as "RiotX Arcane". It launched promotional collaborations with non-Riot games such as PUBG Mobile, Fortnite, and Among Us.

On November 6, 2021, for the global premiere, Riot Games streamed the first episode on Twitch. Some content creators were allowed to co-stream the first three episodes of the series once they received permission from Riot Games, a first for a Netflix series, which also allowed viewers to retrieve in-game drops during the premiere. Drops were only included in the games League of Legends (Arcane Capsule), Wild Rift (“A Single Tear” Emote), Teamfight Tactics (Gizmos & Gadgets Little Legends Egg), Legends of Runeterra (“Fascinating” Emote), and Valorant ("Fishbones" Gun Buddy). The premiere received 1.8 million concurrent viewers on Twitch.

On November 21, Netflix and Riot Games partnered with Secret Cinema to bring players directly into the world of Arcane with an in-person experience in Los Angeles, California. The experience was "equipped with bespoke backstories and missions, the line between actors and audience is truly blurred as players explore the dark and dangerous underworld and encounter its inhabitants—the strange, the sinister and sometimes even the friendly".

Release
Originally set for a 2020 release, the show was rescheduled for a release in 2021 due to the COVID-19 pandemic. It was scheduled for a simultaneous November 6, 2021, release on Netflix and China's Tencent Video, with the series broken into nine episodes, with three episode "acts" being released once a week over three weeks.

Soundtrack
On November 20, 2021, songs from the first season were released on Amazon Music. The series had a different opening theme in China — "孤勇者 (Gu Yong Zhe)" performed by Eason Chan.

Reception

Critical reception

The review aggregator website Rotten Tomatoes reported a 100% approval rating with an average rating of 9.10/10, based on 26 reviews. The site's critical consensus reads, "Arcane makes an arresting first impression, combining a spectacular mix of 2D and 3D animation with an emotionally compelling story to deliver a video game adaptation that could become legendary." The series also became Netflix's number-one show in November 2021, setting the record as Netflix's highest-rated series so far within a week of its premiere, ranked first on the Netflix Top 10 Chart in 52 countries, and ranked second on the chart in the United States.

Writing for IGN, Rafael Motamayor called the first season of Arcane a "classic in the making, and the nail in the coffin of the so-called video game curse." He noted that the show worked for fans of League of Legends and newcomers, saying that "the character stories are what keep you engaged episode after episode; the lore is just icing on the cake." He also praised the voice cast, highlighting the performances of Leung, Purnell, Aghdashloo and Steinfeld, calling the latter performance the show's standout. Praising the animation, Motamayor called it the "most stunning piece of animation since Spider-Man: Into the Spider-Verse" and compared it to Invincible in terms of episode structure. He concluded by saying that Arcane "delivers a killing blow to the idea that video games cannot be masterfully adapted... with compelling characters, an endearing story, and fascinating lore and worldbuilding, as well as striking visuals," calling it a "once-in-a-generation masterpiece" and giving it a 10 out of 10 rating.

Andrew Webster of The Verge praised the "fantasy-meets-steampunk world" and how no knowledge of League was needed to understand the show. Despite calling Act 1 "a fairly typical fantasy tale" he lauded the animation, saying that "each frame looks like a gorgeous piece of hand-painted concept art; in motion, it's like nothing I've ever seen" and that  "it's also a world that feels lived-in and fully realized." Matt Cabral of Common Sense Media called the first season "visually stunning" and that it "features the sort of nuanced characterizations, thoughtful storytelling, and rich worldbuilding typically associated with big-budget, big-screen epics." He also took note of the blend of fantasy, steampunk and sci-fi with emphasis on how the story puts a "fresh spin on the heavily recycled premise." Cabral concluded that viewers didn't need to have played League to appreciate the show.

Reviewing the first four episodes of the first season, Tara Bennett of Paste enjoyed the way that "[the creators] purposefully made an adult animated drama that unflinchingly utilizes violence, adult language, and very dark storylines when needed to make the lives of the large ensemble cast resonate." Bennett favorably compared the series to Game of Thrones, Shadow and Bone, Castlevania and BioShock. She was also positive about the "nuance and subtle facial movements" of Fortiche's animation combined with the performances from Steinfeld, Jenness, Purnell and Spisak. Bennett called "Enemy" by Imagine Dragons "infectious" and that the show is "the new benchmark for what can be done when it comes to successfully translating worthy videogame universes into a different medium."

Many publications noted that the series has been highlighted as one of the greatest video game adaptations.

Accolades
Arcane became the first streaming television series based on a video game as well as the first video game adaptation to win both Annie Awards and Primetime Emmy Awards, as the former became the first streaming series to both win the most awards from the same nominations in a single year, and to sweep the Annies with nine, while the latter won Outstanding Animated Program, becoming the first Netflix series to do so. Arcane also won the inaugural category Best Adaptation (awarded to media based on video games) from The Game Awards 2022.

See also 
 League of Legends

References

External links
 
 
 Arcane: Bridging the Rift | League of Legends - Five part "behind the scenes" video series documenting production

2020s American adult animated television series
2020s American drama television series
2020s American animated television series
2020s French animated television series
2020s French drama television series
2021 American television series debuts
2021 French television series debuts
American adult animated action television series
American adult animated adventure television series
American adult computer-animated television series
American adult animated drama television series
American adult animated fantasy television series
American adult animated science fiction television series
American animated action television series
American animated adventure television series
American animated drama television series
American animated science fantasy television series
Animated action television series
Animated adventure television series
Animated drama television series
Animated fantasy television series
Animated science fantasy television series
Animated series based on video games
Animated television series by Netflix
Annie Award winners
Emmy Award-winning programs
English-language Netflix original programming
League of Legends
Riot Games
The Game Awards winners
Steampunk television series